Macrocoma buettikeriana is a species of leaf beetle of Saudi Arabia, Oman and Egypt described by  in 1979.

References

buettikeriana
Beetles of Asia
Beetles described in 1979
Insects of the Arabian Peninsula